Oleksandr Mykolayovych Stepanov (born 26 May 1983) is a former Ukrainian football player.

Stepanov debuted on 21 March 2001 by coming as a substitute in the Ukrainian First League against FC Chornomorets Odesa. Soon after Bukovyna relegated to the third tier, in 2002 Stepanov moved Russia where he joined Saturn Ramenskoye playing at the top level. However, he only played for the club's reserve squad. On 16 March 2003 Stepanov debuted at the Russian Premier League by coming as a substitute for FC Spartak-Alania Vladikavkaz in a game against FC Dynamo Moscow. The same year he was transferred out to Kuzbass.

In 2008 Stepanov reappeared in Finland playing for the third-tier team and in 2008 moved back to Ukraine where he tried his skills in futsal by playing for his hometown club Merkuriy Chernivtsi. In spring of 2009 he joined struggling FC Zirka Kirovohrad.

External links
 

1983 births
Living people
Ukrainian footballers
FC Bukovyna Chernivtsi players
FC Spartak Vladikavkaz players
FC Saturn Ramenskoye players
Russian Premier League players
Ukrainian expatriate footballers
Expatriate footballers in Russia
Expatriate footballers in Finland
FC Zirka Kropyvnytskyi players
Association football forwards
FC Novokuznetsk players